Historic Palmyra (New York)

The Official organizational founding of Historic Palmyra was in 1912 with first meetings of the Palmyra Historic Society. Historic Palmyra has records covering all areas of the society and all years the society had activities.
As the Society expanded all new activities and records from 1934–69 and another collection covering 1964-2005.

Collections 

Collections relating to history of Wayne County, New York area and the Palmyra, New York.  Most of these items are not on the internet and to get access to them go to the Historic Palmyra site, call or email.  A small charge is made for any assistance.

 Highway use records from 1800s
 Family bibles from 1790s
 Day books from 1800–1900
 Erie Canal information
 Original art work (Examples)
 E. J. Read 
 Major John Gilbert type setter for the Book of Mormon
 E. B. Grandin  
 Private District school records Palmyra, NY 1816-1833  
 Military artifacts – 1812 – current
 Photographs of early schools, homes, businesses, street views
 Religious artifacts and history
 Wayne County Fair history
 Original manuscripts on history of Palmyra, 1836 by James Reeves
 Indentures  1789 - 1900
 Underground Railroad Records Records that show what happened to some of those who traveled the Underground Railroad to the Palmyra Area. this information covering 1816-1880s.
 Deeds 1790 - 1900
 Photographs and other art work 1794–1970s
 Newspapers 1826 - current
 Business records 1801 – mid-1900s
 Urban Renewal History – Palmyra, NY 1964–1976

Museums 
 Alling Coverlet Museum – 122 William Street – Palmyra, NY  14522    This Museum was founded and opened in 1976 on July 4.   
 The Old Newspaper Printing office and type office shows 40 years of newspaper printing equipment, office equipment and type, and much more.
 William Phelps Museum construction in 1826. Proprietor William Phelps completed renovations to the store by 1875.  This site includes much about the life style of the 1800s, including the home and general store of the William Phelps. 
 Palmyra Historical Museum The main museum is loaded with both historical and genealogical items many of these are listed above.

History

Fight for Palmyra 

Urban Renewal History – Palmyra, NY 1964–1976  The Federal Government had Palmyra scheduled for Urban Renewal.  This would have taken much of the older down town now the historical part of Palmyra.  Historic Palmyra saved the north side of the Village of Palmyra included the Grandin Building, all buildings between William and Market Street as well as business district on William Street and Market Street.

Address 
Historic Palmyra
132 Market Street
Palmyra, New York 14522

Other New York Historical Societies and Museums 

New-York Historical Society
List of museums and cultural institutions in New York City
List of New York City Designated Landmarks in Manhattan from 59th to 110th Streets
History of New York
History of New York City
Timeline of New York City
Brooklyn Historical Society
History of Brooklyn
Timeline of Brooklyn
History of Queens
History of the Bronx
History of Staten Island
Hudson River School
American History Book Prize
"The Course of Empire"
New York and New Jersey campaign

Historical societies in New York (state)